The 15th Vanier Cup was played on November 17, 1979, at Varsity Stadium in Toronto, Ontario, and decided the CIAU football champion for the 1979 season. The Acadia Axemen won their first ever championship by defeating the Western Mustangs by a score of 34-12.

References

External links
 Official website

Vanier Cup
Vanier Cup
1979 in Toronto
November 1979 sports events in Canada